is a Japanese anime director.

Works

Anime television series
Azumanga Daioh : Storyboard (eps 7, 14, 18, 23), Episode Director (eps 7, 13, 18, 23)
Cardcaptor Sakura : Storyboard (eps 40, 46, 57, 68), Episode Director (eps 40, 46–47, 57, 64, 68)
Flame of Recca : Storyboard, Episode Director
Galaxy Angel : Storyboard, Unit Director
Galaxy Angel A : Director, Storyboard, Unit Director (OP)
Galaxy Angel S : Director
Galaxy Angel X – Director
Hime-sama Goyōjin – Director, Original Work
Kanamemo – Director, Storyboard (Ep. 1), Episode Director (Ep. 1)
Maze – Storyboard (ep 21)
Panyo Panyo Di Gi Charat – Director, Storyboard (Eps. 1–4, 10, 47, 48), Episode Director (Eps. 1–4, 9–12, 17–20, 47)
Rumbling Hearts – Storyboard (ep 9), Episode Director (ep 9)
Shin Megami Tensei: Devil Children – Episode Director
Skull Man – Storyboard (ep 4)
Sola – Storyboard (ep 9), Episode Director (ep 9)
The World God Only Knows – Director
The World God Only Knows II – Director
Tokyo ESP – Director
Dagashi Kashi – Director, Series Composition
Blood Blockade Battlefront & Beyond - Director

Anime movie
Ninku the Movie – Production General Assistant
Cardcaptor Sakura: The Movie – Assistant Animation Director, Screenplay Association
Cardcaptor Sakura Movie 2: The Sealed Card – Storyboard, Direction Cooperation

External links
 

Living people
Anime directors
Year of birth missing (living people)